Thubchen Lhakang Monastery (Nepali: थुबचेन गुम्बा, Thubchen Gumba or Gompa) is a 15th century Buddhist monastery located in Lo Manthang, Upper Mustang in Nepal. The monastery has ancient wall paintings drawn with hues of turquoise, malachite, cinnamon and gold. These walls were damaged but restored later by King Mahendra Trust for Nature Conservation and American Himalayan Foundation in 1999.

Structure
The monastery is constructed with stone, clay and wood. The main structure is 37.20m long, 24m wide and 12m high. The entrance door is carved with six lion heads and scriptures in Ranjana script. Next to the entrance lies earthen statues of Dhvajarāja (Vaisravana) and Vinaraja in the north and Khadgaraja and Chaityaraja in the south. The main hall is supported by 35 wooden (originally 42  pillars). The central ceiling embeds a skylight bounded by a square of 36 lion heads. The northern wall was restored in 1815 by Padma Bhuti. The structure has survived many earthquakes.

Mural Paintings
The eastern wall of the hall images featuring posture of Buddha and various small  Buddhas around him and the Vairocana Buddha in the gesture setting the Dharmachakra in motion. There are eight paintings of the Buddha on the southern wall and one on the western wall. These paintings date back to the 15th century AD. The paintings on the northern wall were restored in the 19th century. The paintings are as big as 7m tall and 3.40m wide.

Repair of 1998
In 1998 the monastery was repaired through Thubchen Gonpa Conservation Project. The whole roof was completely repaired. The damaged parts were replaced and covered over again with stone and mud. The skylight in the roof was modified such that the light which entered through the top now enters from the south. The damaged painting was also restored. These repairs were criticized by the local people.

Gallery

See also
List of monastery in Nepal

Notes

References

Buddhist monasteries in Nepal
15th-century establishments in Nepal
16th-century establishments in Nepal
Buildings and structures in Mustang District